Ekaterine Gorgodze and Nastja Kolar were the defending champions, but both players chose not to participate.

María José Martínez Sánchez and Marina Melnikova won the title, defeating Paula Kania and Lesley Kerkhove in the final, 6–4, 5–7, [10–8].

Seeds

Draw

References 
 Draw

2010s in Ankara
2015 in Turkish tennis
Ankara Cup - Doubles
Ankara Cup